Scott Lamphear is a retired American soccer defender and coach.  He was a 1995  first team All American and the team MVP on the 1995
NCAA championship Wisconsin Badgers soccer team.  He later served as an assistant coach with the Colorado College men's and women's soccer teams.

Player
Lamphear attended the University of Wisconsin where he played on the men's soccer team from 1992 to 1995. In 1995, the Badgers won the NCAA championship as Lamphear was selected as a first team All American.  On March 4, 1996, the MetroStars selected Lamphear in the 2nd round (11th overall) of the 1996 MLS College Draft.  However, he negotiated with the MetroStars to allow him to finish his degree before joining the team. He graduated in December 1996 with a bachelor's degree in chemical engineering.  In 2011, the Badgers inducted Lamphear into the school's Hall of Fame.  In the spring of 1997, he joined the MetroStars, but was cut during the preseason.  He then played for the Rockford Raptors of the USISL during the 1996 and 1997 seasons and the Chicago Stingers in 1998. In 2011 Lamphear was added to the UW Athletic Hall of Fame.

Coach
In 2001, Colorado College hired Lamphear as an assistant coach with its NCAA Division III men's team.  In April 2003, Lamphear became an assistant with the school's NCAA Division I  women's team.  He held that position until April 2006.

Early years
Lamphear attended Livonia Churchill High School where he played alongside Mike Gentile and Jeff Cassar and were finalist in the 1990 Class A State Championship for the State of Michigan.

References

1974 births
Living people
American soccer coaches
American soccer players
Wisconsin Badgers men's soccer players
College women's soccer coaches in the United States
Colorado College people
Chicago Sockers players
Rockford Raptors players
Colorado Springs Blizzard players
USISL Select League players
USL Second Division players
USL League Two players
New York Red Bulls draft picks
Soccer players from Michigan
All-American men's college soccer players
Association football defenders
NCAA Division I Men's Soccer Tournament Most Outstanding Player winners